Charles Augustus Goodchap (2 April 1837 – 20 October 1896) was a New South Wales politician.

Goodchap was born in Kent, England, and educated at Huntingdon Grammar School. He went to New South Wales in 1853, and obtained a clerkship in the Colonial Secretary's office, from which he was transferred to the Lands and Works Department in 1856, and in 1859 to the Department of Public Works. He became Chief Clerk for Railways in 1870, Secretary for Railways in 1875, and Commissioner for Railways in 1878. Goodchap retired from the Civil Service of New South Wales in 1888.

He stood as a Protectionist candidate at the 1889 election for the Legislative Assembly for Redfern and was the fourth candidate elected. He did not contest the following election in 1891 due to business commitments.

Goodchap was appointed to the Legislative Council in May 1892 where he remained until his death.

Goodchap died unmarried in Potts Point, Sydney on 20 October 1896.

References

 

1837 births
1896 deaths
People from Kent
Members of the New South Wales Legislative Assembly
Members of the New South Wales Legislative Council
19th-century Australian politicians